Shree Tribhuvan Shanti Model Secondary School is situated at Pokhara Metropolitancity ward number 30 , kaski district. It was established in 1969 A.D. November 16. The nearest cities are Bhandardhik, Shishuwa, Pokhara.

References

Schools in Nepal
Kaski District
Educational institutions established in 1959
1959 establishments in Nepal
Schools in Pokhara